This is a list of Somerset Twenty20 cricket records; that is, record team and individual performances in Twenty20 cricket for Somerset County Cricket Club.

Team

Highest innings totals

Lowest innings totals

Largest victory margin (by runs)

Largest victory margin (by wickets)
, Somerset have won by 10 wickets on four occasions. The highest target they have reached without losing a wicket is 169 against Kent in June 2021.

Batting

Highest individual score

Most runs in a season

Most career runs
Qualification - 1,000 runs

Highest Partnership for each wicket

Bowling
 Best Bowling: 6/5 Arul Suppiah v Glamorgan at SWALEC Stadium, 2011
 Wickets in Season: 33 Alfonso Thomas, 2010

Most Twenty20 wickets for Somerset
Qualification - 25 wickets

See also
 List of Somerset first-class cricket records
 List of Somerset List A cricket records

References

Somerset
Somerset County Cricket Club
Cricket
Somerset